Turkana Boy, also called Nariokotome Boy, is the name given to fossil KNM-WT 15000, a nearly complete skeleton of a Homo ergaster youth who lived 1.5 to 1.6 million years ago. This specimen is the most complete early hominin skeleton ever found.
It was discovered in 1984 by Kamoya Kimeu on the bank of the Nariokotome River near Lake Turkana in Kenya.

Estimates of the individual's age at death range from 7 to 11 years old.

Adolescence and maturity
Although the specimen is largely considered male due to the shape of the pelvis, the sex is ultimately indeterminate due to its prepubescent age. Estimates of the age at death depend on whether the maturity stage of the teeth or skeleton is used, and whether that maturity is compared to that of Homo sapiens or to chimpanzees. A key factor is that modern humans have a marked adolescent growth spurt, whereas chimpanzees do not. Initial research assumed a modern human type of growth, but recent evidence from other fossils suggests this was less present in early Hominids. This difference affects the estimates of both the age and the likely stature of the specimen as a fully grown adult.

Alan Walker and Richard Leakey in 1993 estimated the boy to have been about 11–12 years old based on known rates of bone maturity. Walker and Leakey (1993) said that dental dating often gives a younger age than a person's actual age.

Christopher Dean (M. C. Dean) of University College London, in a 2009 Nova special, estimated that the Turkana Boy was 8 years old at death.

Morphology
The specimen comprises 108 bones, making it the most complete early human skeleton discovered. The pelvis is narrower than in Homo sapiens, which is most likely for more efficient upright walking. This further indicates a fully terrestrial bipedalism, which is unlike older hominin species that show a combined feature of bipedalism and tree climbing. The Boy was relatively tall, which increased his body surface area that would enhance heat dissipation and prevent heat stress under the hot sun.

The overall KNM-WT 15000 skeleton still had features (such as a low sloping forehead, strong brow ridges, and the absence of a chin) not seen in H. sapiens. However, there are significant defining characters, such as bigger brain size (880 cc). The arms and legs are slightly longer indicating effective bipedality. The nose is projecting like those of humans rather than the open flat nose seen in other apes. Body hair may also have been thinner (most likely naked) and possibly with increased sweat glands to hasten cooling. However, despite the appearance shown in the reconstruction of Turkana Boy, it's unlikely he actually had dark skin.  The emergence of skin pigmentation in the genus Homo dates to about 1.2 million years ago. Genetic analysis suggests that high activity in the melanocortin 1 receptor, which produces dark skin, dates back to approximately that time.

Vocal capabilities
The fossil skeleton and other fossil evidence, such as Acheulean stone tools, prompt the majority of scientists to conclude that Homo ergaster and Homo erectus – unlike their more primitive ancestors – became efficient hunters. The social structure would probably have become more complex with a larger brain volume; the Broca's area of the brain allows speech and is noted by a slight slant on the cranium. Turkana Boy's thoracic vertebrae are narrower than in Homo sapiens. This would have allowed him less motor control over the thoracic muscles that are used in modern humans to modify respiration to enable the sequencing upon single exhalations of complex vocalisations.

Disease
Early studies indicated that Turkana Boy suffered from a congenital disorder, either dwarfism or scoliosis. This was because the rib bones appeared asymmetrical to the spine, at the time attributed to skeletal dysplasia. However, in 2013, a study showed that when the rib bones were rearranged, they became symmetrical against the spine, and that an unusual structure of the vertebrae was characteristic of the early hominins. However, the fossil definitely showed lumbar disc herniation, an injury implicated with the specimen's death. The specimen also had a diseased mandible.

See also

List of human evolution fossils

Notes

References

Further reading

 – Good popular level presentation
 – Technical papers

External links

Human Timeline (Interactive) – Smithsonian
Celebrating the Turkana Human - Google Doodles

Homo ergaster fossils
Pleistocene
Lake Turkana
Archaeology in Kenya
Prehistoric Kenya
1984 in Kenya
1984 archaeological discoveries
Archaeology of Eastern Africa